The Theban Tomb TT49 is located in El-Khokha. It forms part of the Theban Necropolis, situated on the west bank of the Nile opposite Luxor. TT49 was the burial place of the ancient Egyptian official Neferhotep, who was a Chief Scribe of Amun. Neferhotep lived during the reign of Tutankhamen, Ay and Horemheb, at the end of the Eighteenth Dynasty of Egypt. He was a son of Neby, who was a servant of Amun and the lady Iuy. His wife was named Merytre

Tomb
The tomb of Neferhotep is situated off a courtyard, which also contains the entrances to the tombs of Pakhihet (TT187), Pa-anemwaset (TT362), Paraemheb (TT363) which all date to the end of the 19th Dynasty. In the courtyard two stela flanked the entrance to the tomb. The entrance leads into a hall which connects via a doorway to a pillared hall which contains four pillars. At the back of the pillared hall a niche contains seated statues of Neferhotep and his wife.

See also
 List of Theban tombs

References

Theban tombs
Buildings and structures of the Eighteenth Dynasty of Egypt